Henry John Pankhurst (1884 – 9 May 1921) was a British track and field athlete who competed in sprinting events.  He competed at the 1908 Summer Olympics in London.

In the 100 metres, Pankhurst took second place in his first round heat with a time of 11.5 seconds, just behind Harold Huff who won with 11.4 seconds.  Pankhurst did not advance to the semifinals.

Pankhurst did not advance to the semifinals in the 200 metres either, placing third in his preliminary heat.

References

Sources
 
 
 

1884 births
1921 deaths
Athletes (track and field) at the 1908 Summer Olympics
Olympic athletes of Great Britain
Sportspeople from Newcastle-under-Lyme
British male sprinters
English male sprinters